Thomas Benoît Lemar (born 12 November 1995) is a French professional footballer who plays as a midfielder for La Liga club Atlético Madrid and the France national team. He is known for his versatility, being able to play on both wings and through the centre. Features of his game include dribbling and passing ability.

Lemar began his senior career at Caen in 2013. He played 32 times for the club, before moving to Monaco for £3.4 million in 2015. In 2018, he signed for La Liga club Atlético Madrid, where he won the UEFA Super Cup in his debut season.

Lemar represented France at every level from U17 to U21, and made his international senior debut in 2016 against the Ivory Coast. He was a member of the team that won the 2018 FIFA World Cup, also featuring at UEFA Euro 2020.

Club career

Caen
Lemar made his Ligue 2 debut in the opening game of the 2013–14 season on 2 August 2013, replacing Jérôme Rothen after 78 minutes in Caen's 3–1 home win over Dijon.

Monaco

2015–16 season
On 1 July 2015, Lemar officially joined Monaco for an undisclosed fee. He scored his first goal for the club on 22 August 2015, scoring in a 1–1 draw with Toulouse. On 20 September, he scored in the club's 2–3 home loss to Lorient. Four days later, Lemar scored in Monaco's 3–2 win over Montpellier at the Stade de la Mosson. On 17 January 2016, Lemar scored in Monaco's 2–0 away win over Lorient. On 4 March, Lemar scored the opening goal in Monaco's 2–2 draw with his former club Caen.

2016–17 season

On 14 September 2016, Lemar scored his first goal of the season in Monaco's 2–1 away win over English club Tottenham Hotspur. Three days later, he scored twice in Monaco's 3–0 win over Rennes. On 1 October, he scored the opening goal in Monaco's 7–0 away win over Metz. On 21 October, he scored the fifth of six goals in Monaco's 6–2 win over Montpellier, and on 18 November, he scored in Monaco's 3–0 win over Lorient. On 22 November, Lemar scored the winning goal in Monaco's 2–1 win over Tottenham Hotspur, scoring in the 53rd minute with his goal coming one minute after Tottenham had equalized through Harry Kane in the 52nd minute.

On 15 January 2017, Lemar scored in Monaco's 4–1 win over Marseille, which moved Monaco to the top of the table. On 1 February, Lemar scored in Monaco's 5–4 win over Championnat National club Chambly. On 1 March, Lemar scored the winning goal in a 4–3 extra-time away win over Marseille in a 2016–17 Coupe de France round of 16 match. On 1 April, Lemar scored in the Coupe de la Ligue Final against Paris Saint-Germain, scoring the equalizer in the 27th minute, but Monaco eventually would lose the final 4–1. Lemar finished the season with 14 goals in all competitions.

2017–18 season
In the 2017 summer transfer window, Lemar was linked to Premier League clubs Liverpool and Arsenal, though an agreement was never reached. On 29 June, Monaco rejected a £31m bid from Arsenal, and in late August, Liverpool had a bid of £65m rejected. On the final day of the transfer window, Arsenal made a final offer of €100m, contingent on Alexis Sanchez moving to Manchester City for €65m but the move collapsed as Lemar was informed on extremely short notice, just hours before a crucial World Cup qualification fixture against the Netherlands. 

On 28 October 2017, Lemar scored his first goal of the season in Monaco's 2–0 win over Bordeaux. On 15 December, Lemar scored the second goal in Monaco's 4–0 win over AS Saint-Étienne. On 9 January 2018, Lemar scored in Monaco's 2–1 away win over Nice in the 2017–18 Coupe de la Ligue quarter-finals.

Atlético Madrid
On 18 June 2018, La Liga club Atlético Madrid confirmed that an agreement had been reached with Monaco for the transfer of Lemar.
On 27 July, Lemar successfully passed his medical, joining for a reported fee of €70 million. On 22 September, Lemar scored his first league goal for Atletico against Getafe in a 2–0 away win, where he also hit the shot that resulted in an own goal for Getafe keeper David Soria. He ended the 2018–19 season with three goals in all competitions. 

In the 2019–20 season, Lemar featured in 29 matches in all competitions, yet he finished the season with no goals and no assists. On 5 December 2020, Lemar scored his side's opening goal against Valladolid in a 2–0 win, ending a run of 45 matches at club level without scoring dating back to April 2019.

In the 2020–21 season, as manager Diego Simeone began experimenting with the 3–5–2 formation, Lemar surprisingly became a starter in the position of a left-sided central midfielder despite fierce competition from Saúl Ñíguez.

International career
Lemar was called up to the senior France squad to face Sweden and Ivory Coast in November 2016 after Kingsley Coman withdrew through injury. He made his debut on 15 November against the latter, replacing Adrien Rabiot for the final 12 minutes of a home friendly match that ended in 0–0 draw. His first international goals for the senior team came in a 2018 World Cup qualifying match against the Netherlands, scoring twice as France won 4–0.

On 17 May 2018, he was called up by manager Didier Deschamps to the 23-man French squad for the 2018 FIFA World Cup in Russia. He made his only appearance of the tournament in France's final group match against Denmark on 26 June, which ended in a 0–0 draw. On 15 July, France won the World Cup for the second time in their history after defeating Croatia 4–2 in the final of the tournament.

Style of play
Lemar is a versatile midfielder able to play on both wings as well as through the centre and in a free role. He is predominantly left footed, but is also competent with his right foot. He is noted for his excellent dribbling skills, strong passing ability and free kicks. He has said he prefers to link-up with teammates, rather than taking on defenders: "I am trying to avoid duels and concentrate on passing as much as possible." He will often attempt to score from long range.

Career statistics

Club

International

As of match played 1 September 2021. France score listed first, score column indicates score after each Lemar goal.

Honours
Monaco
Ligue 1: 2016–17

Atlético Madrid
La Liga: 2020–21
UEFA Super Cup: 2018

France
FIFA World Cup: 2018

Individual
UEFA Champions League Breakthrough XI: 2016
UNFP Ligue 1 Player of the Month: November 2016

Orders
Knight of the Legion of Honour: 2018

References

External links

Profile at the Atlético Madrid website

1995 births
Living people
People from Baie-Mahault
French footballers
France youth international footballers
France under-21 international footballers
France international footballers
Guadeloupean footballers
Association football midfielders
Association football wingers
Stade Malherbe Caen players
AS Monaco FC players
Atlético Madrid footballers
Championnat National 2 players
Championnat National 3 players
Ligue 2 players
Ligue 1 players
La Liga players
2018 FIFA World Cup players
UEFA Euro 2020 players
FIFA World Cup-winning players
French expatriate footballers
Expatriate footballers in Monaco
Expatriate footballers in Spain
French expatriate sportspeople in Monaco
French expatriate sportspeople in Spain
Chevaliers of the Légion d'honneur
Black French sportspeople
French people of Guadeloupean descent